Becky Beard (born June 22, 1960) is an American politician who has served in the Montana House of Representatives from the 80th district since 2017.

References

1960 births
Living people
Republican Party members of the Montana House of Representatives
Women state legislators in Montana
21st-century American politicians
21st-century American women politicians
Carroll College (Montana) alumni